This is an incomplete list of all military confrontations that have occurred within the boundaries of the modern U.S. state of Missouri since European contact.

Gallery

Missouri
Battles
Missouri
Battles in Missouri
Battles
Battles
Military history of Missouri